Wayne Souza (June 10, 1958 – July 21, 1979) was an American football player. He grew up in New Bedford, Massachusetts where he was a standout football player at New Bedford High School. He was a quarterback and a halfback. Souza was also a standout track athlete. He went on to play football for the division one Wisconsin Badgers. Souza was a two way starter, his sophomore year he played defensive back in nine games. In his junior year, Souza was on offense as a receiver: he caught 24 passes for 323 yards and three touchdowns.

Career
While still in high school Souza was recruited by Tulane University and the University of Wisconsin. Souza eventually decided to go to Wisconsin, and he was recruited to play Free Safety on defense. By his Junior year he was playing more and contributing. He played on offense as a wide receiver and a running back.

Souza was a two way starter who died prior to entering his senior year. He was also a two time letter winner for the Wisconsin Badgers.

Personal
His parents were John and Madelyn Souza. He had one brother and two sisters.

Death
Souza and a friend went boating on Lake Monona, near Madison, Wisconsin, on a hot day on July 21, 1979. Souza decided to go swimming and he drowned. It was thought that he suffered a cramp. His body was not found until the next day. He was buried in New Bedford, Massachusetts. The University of Wisconsin football team has since instituted an annual team award honoring Souza and Jay Seiler who died during spring practice in the same year. The awards are the Jay Seiler Coaches Appreciation Award (defense) and the Wayne Souza Coaches Appreciation Award (offense).

References

1959 births
1979 deaths
Accidental deaths in Wisconsin
Deaths by drowning in the United States
Players of American football from Massachusetts
Sportspeople from New Bedford, Massachusetts
Wisconsin Badgers football players